Benjámin Gledura (born 4 July 1999) is a Hungarian chess grandmaster.

Chess career
Born in 1999, Gledura earned his international master title in 2014 and his grandmaster title in 2016. He is the No. 6 ranked Hungarian player as of February 2019.

Gledura competed in the Tata Steel Challengers in January 2019, placing third with 8½/13 (+5–1=7). In March, he participated in the European Individual Chess Championship. He placed 19th with 7½/11 (+5–1=5) and qualified for the Chess World Cup 2019.

References

External links

1999 births
Living people
Chess grandmasters
Hungarian chess players
People from Eger